Fábio Gomes (born February 6, 1981 in Rio Claro), is a Brazilian defensive midfielder. He currently plays for Paulista Futebol Clube.

Honours
 Campeonato Paulista Série A2 in 2001 with Paulista
 Campeonato Brasileiro Série C in 2001 with Paulista
 Copa do Brasil in 2005 with Paulista
 Campeonato Pernambucano in 2008 with Sport Club do Recife
 Copa do Brasil in 2008 with Sport Club do Recife

Contract

External links
 Sport Club do Recife Official Site
 sambafoot
 zerozero.pt
 meusport
 CBF

1981 births
Living people
Brazilian footballers
Paulista Futebol Clube players
Sociedade Esportiva Palmeiras players
Sport Club do Recife players
Clube Atlético Sorocaba players
Association football midfielders